Pia de' Tolomei is an oil painting on canvas by English artist Dante Gabriel Rossetti, painted around 1868 and now in the Spencer Museum of Art, on the campus of the University of Kansas in Lawrence, Kansas.

History
This work was painted at the start of Rossetti's affair with Jane Morris, who modelled for the picture. As he was to do with Beata Beatrix (1870), Rossetti chose a tale by Dante Aligheri (from Purgatorio) to illustrate his love for his model. The story tells of a woman whose husband imprisoned and later poisoned her:<ref>Cf. Dante Alighieri, The Divine Comedy, "Purgatorio", Canto V, vv.130–136 "Pia de' Tolomei".</ref> Rossetti wanted the world to believe the fantasy with which he was deluding himself – that William Morris kept Jane against her will. He continued this theme, as shown in Proserpine.

Rossetti not only drew Jane exhaustively, he also choreographed photographic sessions of her and used the photographs as preliminary sketches for drawings. Amongst other representations of her, Rossetti depicts Jane as Proserpine, Queen Guinevere and Desdemona – all of whom were at the mercy of men.

Jane appears disproportionately large in most of Rossetti's pictures. The background is immaterial as long as the viewer focuses on the beauty of her face. In Pia de' Tolomei her elongated neck seems almost dislocated, and the whiteness of her skin shines out, defying the viewer to pay attention to any other aspects of the painting. Miller's hair colour is misrepresented in the painting. Her natural colour was dark brown, yet Rossetti paints it with an auburn tinge – closer to Lizzie Siddal's hair colour than Miller's. Also, her hands are twisted and intertwined in a peculiar way.

Gallery

See also
 Jane Morris, the artist's model
 List of paintings by Dante Gabriel Rossetti
 Rossetti and His Circle by Max Beerbohm, 1922

References

Further reading
 Doughty, Oswald. (1949) A Victorian Romantic: Dante Gabriel Rossetti  London: Frederick Muller.
 Hilto, Timoth. (1970) The Pre-Raphelites. London: Thames and Hudson, New York: Abrams.
 Ash, Russell. (1995) Dante Gabriel Rossetti. London: Pavilion Books.
 Surtees, Virginia. (1971) Dante Gabriel Rossetti. 2 vols. Oxford: Clarendon Press.
 Treuherz, Julian. Prettejohn, Elizabeth, and Becker, Edwin (2003) Dante Gabriel Rossetti. London: Thames & Hudson.
 Todd, Pamela. (2001) Pre-Raphaelites at Home'', New York: Watson-Giptill Publications.

External links

 The Rossetti Archive
 Birmingham Museums and Art Gallery's Pre-Raphaelite Online Resource
 Spencer Museum of Art, Kansas

1868 paintings
Works based on Purgatorio
Paintings by Dante Gabriel Rossetti
University of Kansas
Paintings in Kansas
Birds in art
Books in art
Paintings based on works by Dante Alighieri